Park Byeong-ju (born 23 April 1979) is a South Korean cross-country skier. He competed at the 1998 Winter Olympics, the 2002 Winter Olympics and the 2006 Winter Olympics.

References

External links
 

1979 births
Living people
South Korean male cross-country skiers
Olympic cross-country skiers of South Korea
Cross-country skiers at the 1998 Winter Olympics
Cross-country skiers at the 2002 Winter Olympics
Cross-country skiers at the 2006 Winter Olympics
People from Gunsan
Cross-country skiers at the 1999 Asian Winter Games
Cross-country skiers at the 2003 Asian Winter Games
Biathletes at the 2007 Asian Winter Games
Cross-country skiers at the 2011 Asian Winter Games
Medalists at the 1999 Asian Winter Games
Medalists at the 2011 Asian Winter Games
Asian Games bronze medalists for South Korea
Asian Games medalists in cross-country skiing
Sportspeople from North Jeolla Province
20th-century South Korean people
21st-century South Korean people